Tanupat Viriyangkura (born 10 March 1996) is a Thai badminton player.

Achievements

BWF International Challenge/Series (1 runner-up) 
Mixed doubles

  BWF International Challenge tournament
  BWF International Series tournament
  BWF Future Series tournament

References

External links 
 

1996 births
Living people
Tanupat Viriyangkura
Tanupat Viriyangkura
Tanupat Viriyangkura